Cherish Life Queensland (originally known as Queensland Right to Life) is a Queensland anti-abortion group. It is non-denominational, non-party political anti-abortion organisation founded in Brisbane in 1970, before the emergence of similar organisations in other Australian states. Cherish Life Queensland is the state affiliate for the Federation of Right to Life Associations.

History

Cherish Life Queensland was formed in 1970 by a group of concerned Christian women who saw what was happening in America in regards to the push for the legalisation of abortion and wanted to prevent its legalisation in their state. Since its inception as Queensland Right to Life, it has been funded by entirely by donations alone.

At the General Meeting on 21 June 2008, the members present voted for a change of name from "Queensland Right to Life" to "Cherish Life Queensland", which they believed would more accurately represent their opposition to embryonic stem cell research, assisted suicide, as well as abortion.

In May 2019, Anna Palmer wife of Australian businessman Clive Palmer donated $20,000 to Cherish Life Queensland for electoral purposes.

References

External links 
 Cherish Life Queensland | Official website

1970 establishments in Australia
Child welfare in Australia
Children's health in Australia
Euthanasia in Australia
Health law in Australia
Human rights organisations based in Australia
Lobbying organisations in Australia
Murder in Australia
Non-profit organisations based in Queensland
Old age in Australia
Organizations established in 1970
Political advocacy groups in Australia
Suicide in Australia

 

Anti-abortion organisations in Australia